LC Perú S.A.C. was a Peruvian airline based in Lima, Peru. It operated scheduled domestic flights. Its main base was Jorge Chávez International Airport.

History 
The company was founded in 1993, they started operations as a cargo agent. In 1998, charter flights began for the periodic transport of passengers nationwide. In 2003, a second Fairchild Metro III was incorporated and ventured into regular passenger transport, for 2004 the destinations of Cajamarca, Ayacucho, Huánuco and Pucallpa were covered.

In 2011, the airline made an alliance with LAN Perú, in late 2011, the name was changed to the current name LC Perú. From the partnership with the USMP in 2011, the Fairchild Metro were withdrawn, replaced with Bombardier Dash 8 Q200, in 2013 the IOSA Certification and BARS Certification were obtained.

On December 12, 2018, the airline failed to renew its aviation insurance and was forced to declare bankruptcy.

Destinations
, LC Perú served the following destinations:

Fleet

The LC Perú fleet consisted of the following aircraft (as of December 2018):

References

External links

  Official website

Defunct airlines of Peru
Airlines established in 1993
Airlines disestablished in 2018
1993 establishments in Peru
2018 disestablishments in Peru
Defunct companies of Peru